Johannes Stensletten (15 December 1912 – 21 September 1981) was a Norwegian footballer. He played in one match for the Norway national football team in 1939.

References

External links
 

1912 births
1981 deaths
Norwegian footballers
Norway international footballers
Place of birth missing
Association footballers not categorized by position